Forbidden Paradise 5: Arctic Expedition is the fifth album in the Forbidden Paradise series. It is the third album in the series to be mixed by well-known trance DJ/producer Tiësto. As with the rest of the Forbidden Paradise series, the album is a live turntable mix.

Track listing
 Coyote - "Hidden Clouds" [Attic Mix] – 5:03
 Clino - "Voyager" – 4:43
 John Chevalier - "Future Power" [Toja Remix] – 3:27
 Transa - "Prophase" [X-Cabs Remix 1] – 4:36
 Moonman - "Don't Be Afraid" [Original Mix] – 3:27
 Baltique - "Joseph Otten" – 3:55
 Groove Connexion - "Trance-Dance" [Phi-Phi & Greg D. Remix] – 5:02
 Stray Dog - "The Next Chapter" – 4:48
 Junk Project - "Volume III" – 6:31
 Phutura - "Florida 135" – 3:43
 Toja 3 - "A Funky Ass Track" – 3:33
 Wave Shaping Age - "Resolution" – 4:51
 Commander Tom - "Are Am Eye?" [Commander Tom Original Mix] – 4:10
 Angeldust - "In Complete Darkness" – 3:23
 Dubtribe Sound System - "Acceleration" [Zion Train Remix Dubtribe] – 4:56
 DJ Dave Davis - "Transfiguration" – 6:10

Tiësto compilation albums
1996 compilation albums